The Landquart–Thusis railway line is a Swiss metre-gauge railway line running from Landquart via Chur to Thusis. It is part of the Rhaetian Railway core network and provides a connection between the Landquart–Davos Platz railway and the Albula Railway. Between Landquart and Chur, the line runs largely parallel to the standard-gauge Chur–Rorschach railway of Swiss Federal Railways (SBB). The line from Chur to Thusis was opened in 1896.

Description 

 is the starting point of the Rhaetian Railway, historically part of the Landquart–Davos railway, operationally the location of the main workshop and network. It is kilometre 0 for the measurement of distances (chainage) on all core network lines.
 
While the passenger traffic of the SBB ends in Chur, there is a connection with the Arosa Railway and there is a link for standard gauge freight operations using a dual gauge (three-rail) section in Untervaz and a dual gauge section (22.5 tonne axle load) for standard-gauge freight traffic from Chur to Domat/Ems for the factory premises of Ems-Chemie and the large sawmill of Mayr-Melnhof Swiss Timber AG. All rail infrastructure is metre-gauge from Domat/Ems.
 
The line connects at Thusis directly with the Albula Railway, which continues the chainage from Landquart to St. Moritz and continues from Bever on the two branches of the Engadin line to Scuol-Tarasp and Pontresina.
 
Services at Trimmis station were discontinued at the timetable change on 10 December 2006. As a result, Untervaz station was renamed Untervaz-Trimmis, which reflects the uneven development of the municipality of Trimmis.

References

Footnotes

Sources

 
 
 
  (Festschrift for the 100-year anniversary of the line)
 
 
 
 

Railway lines in Switzerland
Railway lines opened in 1896
1896 establishments in Switzerland
Rhaetian Railway lines
Metre gauge railways in Switzerland
11 kV AC railway electrification